"Sidewalks"  is a song by Canadian singer the Weeknd, featuring American rapper Kendrick Lamar, from his third studio album Starboy (2016). The song was written by both artists alongside Doc McKinney, Daniel Wilson, Robert John Richardson, and Ali Shaheed Muhammad, being produced by McKinney, Bobby Raps and Muhammad. The song sampled the song "Fu-Gee-La" by Fugees.

It was one of the tracks off Starboy to be featured in the short film Mania. The song features additional vocals by Daniel Wilson and is the first collaboration between the Weeknd and Lamar. The song was commercially successful, reaching the Top 40 in the United States and the United Kingdom. The song is certified Platinum by Recording Industry Association of America.

Commercial performance
Like the rest of the tracks from Starboy, "Sidewalks'" charted on the Billboard Hot 100, reaching number 27. It reached the top five on the R&B Songs chart and the Top 20 on the Hot R&B/Hip-Hop Songs chart. The song also charted and peaked at number 14 on the Canadian Hot 100, reaching the Top 20.

Charts

Weekly charts

Year-end charts

Certifications

References 

2016 songs
The Weeknd songs
Kendrick Lamar songs
Songs written by Kendrick Lamar
Songs written by the Weeknd
Songs written by Doc McKinney
Songs written by Ali Shaheed Muhammad
Songs written by Daniel Wilson (musician)
Sidewalks in art